Antonis Ranos (born 15 June 1993) is a Greek professional footballer who plays as a forward for Cypriot club ASIL Lysi.

Career
After graduating with Skoda Xanthi, Ranos was promoted to first team in 2012 summer. On 30 September, he made his first team debut, in a 2–3 away defeat against Platanias. On 2 February 2013, he scored his first professional goal, in a 2–0 home win against Platanias.

References

External links
 
 

1993 births
Living people
Greek footballers
Greece youth international footballers
Greek expatriate footballers
Xanthi F.C. players
Aris Limassol FC players
Anagennisi Deryneia FC players
ASIL Lysi players
Super League Greece players
Cypriot First Division players
Cypriot Second Division players
Expatriate footballers in Cyprus
Greek expatriates in Cyprus
Footballers from Xanthi
Association football forwards